Wetherby–Hampton–Snyder–Wilson–Erdman Log House, also known as Cockleburr, Prologue House, and Cabindale, is a historic home located in Tredyffrin Township, Chester County, Pennsylvania. The original section was built about 1725, and is a -story, 2-bay dwelling.  The first story is of slate and the upper stories of log construction.  A -story stone wing was added between 1817 and 1835.  A -story rear wing was added in the 20th century.

It was listed on the National Register of Historic Places in 1973.

References

Houses on the National Register of Historic Places in Pennsylvania
Houses completed in 1725
Houses in Chester County, Pennsylvania
1725 establishments in Pennsylvania
National Register of Historic Places in Chester County, Pennsylvania